Margrethe Pape (1620–1684) was a Danish baroness. She was the mistress of King Frederick III of Denmark and the mother of Ulrik Frederik Gyldenløve.

Margrethe Pape became the lover of Frederick prior to his marriage and succession to the throne. She married the official, amtsforvalter of Segeberg and etatsråd Daniel Hausmann (d. 1670). In 1683, Christian V of Denmark granted her the title Baroness of Løvendal.

References 
 Merete Harding: Margrethe Pape i Den Store Danske, Gyldendal. Hentet 6. oktober 2017 fra http://denstoredanske.dk/index.php?sideId=209625

1620 births
1684 deaths
17th-century Danish people
Mistresses of Danish royalty